The Zappos Theater, originally known as Aladdin Theatre for the Performing Arts, is a mid-sized auditorium located at Planet Hollywood Las Vegas on the Las Vegas Strip. The venue hosts a variety of events, including charity benefits, concerts and award shows. It is used frequently for the beauty pageants Miss Universe, Miss USA and Miss Teen USA. From 2013 to 2017, the auditorium was the home to Britney Spears's concert residency Piece of Me and Justin Timberlake's annual concert to benefit the Shriners Hospitals for Children. The National Football League used the auditorium for the first three rounds of the 2022 NFL Draft and will do so again for the 2024 NFL Honors.  In 2011, it was voted as one of the "Best Concert Halls & Theaters In Las Vegas".

History
While this location was known as the Aladdin Hotel, the owners decided to create a performing arts center to replace the mildly used golf course. Planning began in 1969, with concepts showing the venue as a separate building. In 1972, the hotel was sold to Sam Diamond, Peter Wevve, Sorkis Wevve and Richard Daly. The center opened on July 2, 1976 (America's bicentennial weekend), with Neil Diamond, who was paid $750,000 for five sold-out shows. During the 1970s and 1980s, the auditorium became a staple on the Strip for many rock and roll acts. During the hotel's financial troubles in the 1990s, the center became its main revenue stream. In 1998, the venue closed while the original Aladdin Hotel was imploded. During the renovation, the center's original structure was removed, incorporating the venue into the casino area of the hotel. In 2000, the venue reopened with a performance by Enrique Iglesias, with a capacity decrease to 7,000. Due to the additions of the MGM Grand Garden Arena and Mandalay Bay Events Center, the venue was used infrequently by music acts. In 2004, the venue made international news when spectators walked out of a Linda Ronstadt concert while expressing support for filmmaker Michael Moore. In 2010, the center saw a resurgence in use, hosting at least 15 concerts annually.

The theater was the host of the Miss Universe 1991, 1996, 2012, 2015 and 2017 pageants, several Miss USA pageants and several Miss America pageants. On June 28, 2012, the auditorium was renamed to the "PH Live at Planet Hollywood Resort & Casino". On December 19, 2013, the venue was renamed "The AXIS at Planet Hollywood Resort & Casino". It was also announced that American entertainment company Live Nation Entertainment would take over operations and management of the venue from BASE Entertainment.

The AXIS theatre has been home to headlining concert residencies such as Justin Timberlake & Friends, Paris By Night and Britney: Piece of Me, Jennifer Lopez: All I Have, Backstreet Boys: Larger Than Life and Christina Aguilera: The Xperience

The venue's name was changed to Zappos Theater in February 2018, as part of a five-year marketing deal with online shoe retailer Zappos.

Noted events 
Miss Universe 
Miss America 
Justin Timberlake & Friends 
Miss USA 
Paris By Night 
The Game Awards 
Jimmy Kimmel Live!

Concert residencies

References

External links
 
 

 
1976 establishments in Nevada
Buildings and structures in Paradise, Nevada
Las Vegas Strip
Music venues in the Las Vegas Valley
Theatres in Nevada
Theatres completed in 1976